Autódromo Parque Ciudad de General Roca is a  motorsports circuit located in Rio Negro, Argentina. It has hosted events in the TC2000 and Formula Renault series. The track has 13 corners.

Lap records 

The official race lap records at the Autódromo Parque Ciudad de General Roca are listed as:

References

Motorsport venues in Río Negro Province